Nalla is a 2004 Kannada-language romance-drama film directed by V. Nagendra Prasad featuring Sudeep and Sangeetha in the lead roles. The film features background score and soundtrack composed by Venkat Narayan and lyrics by V. Nagendra Prasad. The film released on 12 November 2004. This movie was dubbed in Hindi as Aur Ek Diljala .

The core plot of the movie is loosely based on the 1982 Tamil movie Moondram Pirai which itself was heavily inspired by Charlie Chaplin's City Lights.

Plot 
Pachchi alias Prashant (Sudeep) finds a girl, Preethi (Sangeetha) in a car, who has lost her memory. Prashant loves her. He takes care of her and admits her to the hospital. 
When in the hospital, her father finds her and takes her home. He thanks him and gives a driver job to him.

Preethi regained her memory and starts finding Prashant. One day Preethi meets with an accident and is taken to the hospital. 
Prashant reveals himself and saves her.

Cast
 Sudeep as Prashanth "Pachhi"
 Sangeetha as Preethi
 Srinath as Preethi's father
 Naveen Mayur as Srikanth
 Apoorva
 Chitra Shenoy
 Tara as Dr Sarala Desai

Soundtrack
The film features background score and soundtrack composed by Venkat Narayan and lyrics by V. Nagendra Prasad.

References

External links
 

2004 films
2000s Kannada-language films
Kannada remakes of Tamil films
Films directed by V. Nagendra Prasad